Roberto Ayza Berça (born 19 May 1981) is a Brazilian football forward who plays for Liga IV side Muscelul Câmpulung. He played for various Romanian teams such as: Cetatea Suceava, Ceahlăul Piatra Neamț, Bihor Oradea, Gloria Bistrița or CS Mioveni.

Career
Ayza started football really late after the age of 23. He went to Romania alone, without knowing anyone and without ever leaving Brazil before.

The coach who received him for the first time on a professional team in Brazil had taken Ayza with him everywhere. At one of the teams, the president asked Ayza if he doesn't want to go to Romania, where he had a friend who wanted players. He was 23 at the time. He would have earned $5,000 in Romania, whilst in Brazil he was earning only $120.

Personal life
Ayza married a Romanian volleyball player, Gabriela, with whom he has 2 children.

References

External links

1981 births
Living people
People from São Caetano do Sul
Brazilian footballers
Association football midfielders
Associação Atlética Ponte Preta players
Liga I players
Liga II players
CSM Ceahlăul Piatra Neamț players
FC Bihor Oradea players
CS Mioveni players
ACF Gloria Bistrița players
Brazilian expatriate footballers
Expatriate footballers in Romania
Brazilian expatriate sportspeople in Romania
Sportspeople with a vision impairment
Footballers from São Paulo (state)